Neoregelia subg. Neoregelia is a subgenus of the genus Neoregelia.

Species
Species accepted by Encyclopedia of Bromeliads as of October 2022:

Neoregelia abendrothae 
Neoregelia amandae 
Neoregelia ampullacea 
Neoregelia angustibracteolata 
Neoregelia angustifolia 
Neoregelia atroviridifolia 
Neoregelia binotii 
Neoregelia brevifolia 
Neoregelia burle-marxii 
Neoregelia camorimiana 
Neoregelia capixaba 
Neoregelia carcharodon 
Neoregelia carinata 
Neoregelia carolinae 
Neoregelia cathcartii 
Neoregelia chlorosticta 
Neoregelia coimbrae 
Neoregelia compacta 
Neoregelia concentrica 
Neoregelia coriacea 
Neoregelia correia-araujoi 
Neoregelia crispata 
Neoregelia cruenta 
Neoregelia cyanea 
Neoregelia dactyloflammans 
Neoregelia desenganensis 
Neoregelia doeringiana 
Neoregelia dungsiana 
Neoregelia eltoniana 
Neoregelia farinosa 
Neoregelia fluminensis 
Neoregelia fosteriana 
Neoregelia gavionensis 
Neoregelia guttata 
Neoregelia hoehneana 
Neoregelia ilhana 
Neoregelia indecora 
Neoregelia insulana 
Neoregelia johannis 
Neoregelia johnsoniae 
Neoregelia kautskyi 
Neoregelia kuhlmannii 
Neoregelia lactea 
Neoregelia laevis 
Neoregelia leprosa 
Neoregelia leucophoea 
Neoregelia lilliputiana 
Neoregelia lillyae 
Neoregelia lymaniana 
Neoregelia macahensis 
Neoregelia macrosepala 
Neoregelia maculata 
Neoregelia macwilliamsii 
Neoregelia magdalenae 
Neoregelia marmorata 
Neoregelia martinellii 
Neoregelia melanodonta 
Neoregelia nevaresii 
Neoregelia nivea 
Neoregelia odorata 
Neoregelia olens 
Neoregelia oligantha 
Neoregelia paratiensis 
Neoregelia pascoaliana 
Neoregelia pauciflora 
Neoregelia petropolitana 
Neoregelia pontualii 
Neoregelia princeps 
Neoregelia punctatissima 
Neoregelia richteri 
Neoregelia roethii 
Neoregelia rubrifolia 
Neoregelia ruschii 
Neoregelia sanguinea 
Neoregelia sapiatibensis 
Neoregelia sarmentosa 
Neoregelia seideliana 
Neoregelia simulans 
Neoregelia smithii 
Neoregelia spectabilis 
Neoregelia tigrina 
Neoregelia tristis 
Neoregelia uleana 
Neoregelia watersiana 
Neoregelia wilsoniana 
Neoregelia zaslawskyi 
Neoregelia zonata

References

Plant subgenera